The 2012 FIRS B-World Cup was the 15th edition of the Roller Hockey B World Championship, . This is an Official competition organized by CIRH. The competition was hosted in Canelones, Uruguay from 24 November to 1 December.

Venues
Canelones was the host city of the tournament, and the Rink was enclosed the Sergio Matto stadium.

Matches
All times are Uruguay Time (UTC-3).

Group stage

Group A

Group B

Knockout stage

Championship

Quarterfinals

Semifinals

3rd/4th Place

Final

5th–9th playoff

Final ranking

References

External links
Official website
CIRH website

B
R
2012 FIRS Men's B-Roller Hockey World Cup
2012 B World Championship